The Walls of Salinillas de Buradon (Spanish: Murallas de Salinillas de Buradon) are walls located in Labastida, Spain. It was declared Bien de Interés Cultural in 1984.

References 

Buildings and structures in Álava
Bien de Interés Cultural landmarks in Álava"
Labastida